The Makeléers are Swedish House of Nobility family 513. The earliest member was Hans Makeléer, 1st Baronet (1604-1666) who migrated to Sweden from Scotland.

Makeléer may refer to:
David Makeléer, 1st Friherre (1646-1708), first governor of Älvsborg County, Sweden
Hans Makeléer, 1st Baronet (1604-1666), Lord of Gåsevadholm, Hageby, and Hammersöö
Johan Makeléer, 2nd Baronet (c1625–c1696), member of the Gothenburg Court of Justice
Jacob Makeléer (died 1663), Oratio de invidia & mutabilitate fortunæ